Christopher Tietze (1908 – April 4, 1984) was a United States physician best known for his stance in the United States pro-choice movement to permit abortion in the United States.

Biography
Christopher Tietze was born in Vienna. He graduated from the medical school at the University of Vienna. In 1938 he came to the United States.

In 1967 he joined the biomedical division of the Population Council. He was a member of seven organizations in the World Health Organization which recommended policy on human reproduction. He criticized attempts to limit access to abortion.

He died on April 4, 1984 at age 75.

Recognition
In 1973 he and his wife Sarat Lewit Tietze won the Margaret Sanger Award of the Planned Parenthood Federation of America. In 1977 he won the American Public Health Association's Carl Schultz Award.

The National Abortion Federation grants the Christopher Tietze Humanitarian Award annually to the person or organization which it recognizes as having advanced its organizational mission.

Selected biography

References

1908 births
1984 deaths
American abortion providers
American abortion-rights activists
Austrian emigrants to the United States